Rolena Adorno is an American humanities scholar, the Spanish Sterling Professor at Yale University and bestselling author.

Writing in 2001, and in the context of a favorable review of a "magnificent study" that she coauthored, James Axtell called her "perhaps the preeminent student of colonial Latin American literature".

Honours
She was awarded the Katherine Singer Kovács Prize of the Modern Language Association of America for her book, The Polemics of Possession in Spanish American Narrative.

On 06 November 2009, she was made a member of the National Endowment for Humanities by President Barack Obama.

She is a fellow of the American Academy of Arts and Sciences, and sits on the Board of Governors of the John Carter Brown Library.

Lawsuit
In 2017, a former Spanish professor at Yale filed a lawsuit claiming that the Yale's Spanish and Portuguese department perpetuated a culture of harassment and discrimination. According to the lawsuit, Roberto Gonzalez Echevarria, department chair Rolena Adorno and department professor Noel Valis made “unsupportive and negative” statements in retaliation for plaintiff’s speaking out against discrimination and sexual harassment, which had an impact in the plaintiff’s tenure denial in 2015. The university newspaper Yale Daily News points out that despite a request for the administration to recuse Echevarria, Adorno and Valis from the vote, they were allowed to participate and each voted against granting tenure to the plaintiff.

Bibliography
Some of her most notable works are:
 Guaman Poma and His Illustrated Chronicles
 The Polemics of Possession in Spanish American Narrative
 Colonial Latin American Literature: A Very Short Introduction
 With Patrick Pautz, Álvar Núñez Cabeza de Vaca: His Account, His Life and the Expedition of Pánfilo de Narváez. 3 vols. Lincoln: University of Nebraska Press, 1999.

References

External links
 

Year of birth missing (living people)
Living people
Yale University faculty
Yale Sterling Professors
University of Iowa alumni
Cornell University alumni